Pycnostictus is a genus of band-winged grasshoppers in the family Acrididae. There is one described species in Pycnostictus, P. seriatus, found in Australasia.

References

External links

 

Acrididae
Monotypic Orthoptera genera